South Central College (SCC) is a public community college in Faribault and North Mankato, Minnesota, United States. Formerly South Central Technical College, the college revised its mission from a technical college to that of a broader, comprehensive community college in 2005, receiving approval from the Minnesota State Colleges and Universities (MnSCU) Board of Trustees on March 16, 2005.  Over 50 programs are offered as certificates, diplomas, Associate of Applied Science (AAS), or Associate of Science (AS) degrees.  With the mission change, SCC offers an Associate of Arts (AA) degree that students use as the first two years of their four-year education.

External links
Official website

Community colleges in Minnesota
Education in Blue Earth County, Minnesota
Education in Nicollet County, Minnesota
Education in Rice County, Minnesota
Educational institutions established in 2005
Two-year colleges in the United States
2005 establishments in Minnesota